Giulio Gari (September 9, 1909 – April 15, 1994) was a versatile and internationally known tenor who performed on both the opera and concert stages. He sang more than fifty-five lyric and dramatic roles. He performed with the New York City Opera from 1945 to 1952 and with the Metropolitan Opera from 1953 to 1961.

Early life 

Gari was born Samu Gyula in 1909 in Mediasch, Nagy-Küküllő County, Austria-Hungary (now Mediaş, Romania), the youngest of a family of ten children. He gained recognition as a child singing in operetta throughout Romania and Hungary. He studied with the celebrated Viennese soprano Lotte Gelinek and later at the Verdi Conservatory in Milan.

Career 

In 1938, he made his operatic debut at Rome's Teatro Reale dell’Opera, when he substituted for Tito Schipa as Almaviva in Gioachino Rossini's Barbiere di Siviglia (The Barber of Seville) under the baton of the legendary Tullio Serafin.

Soon after, he secured a National Broadcasting Company contract singing weekly with the NBC Symphony Orchestra and performing on the NBC Radio show, "Musical Bits", with Phil Spitalny conducting.

In 1939, he sang at the St Louis Opera in the American premiere of Gian Carlo Menotti's Amelia Goes to the Ball, beginning his long association with Maestro Laszlo Halasz, the founder of the New York City Opera.

He served in the American armed forces during World War II as an infantryman with the Eighth Motorized Division, which served in Germany.

In 1945, he made his official debut with a leading American opera company when he appeared at the New York City Opera for the first time as the Steersman in Richard Wagner's Der fliegende Holländer. Composer Virgil Thomson, then music critic of the New York Herald Tribune, wrote "the vocal treat of the evening was Giulio Gari, who sang with beauty of voice, easy command of the heroic style and no hesitancy about the high notes."

He wed Lela Mae Flynn in New York City on Oct. 29, 1946.

Gari toured Latin America and the Caribbean garnering ecstatic reviews, particularly in 1946 when he sang in Beethoven's Ninth Symphony with the Havana Symphony Orchestra under Leopold Stokowski. In Central America he performed with Gladys Swarthout and in Guatemala participated in the first opera season there in twenty years.

On January 6, 1953, Gari made his debut with the Metropolitan Opera singing Pinkerton to the Butterfly of the renowned Licia Albanese. New York Times critic Howard Taubman praised "his fine voice...fine style...skill and polish" and predicted a luminous future for the debutant.

Reaction 

Gari garnered superlative reviews throughout his career. Noel Strauss of The New York Times wrote of his Rodolfo in La Boheme that it provided "the most distinguished vocalism of the evening, he showed sensitivity and marked refinement of style, climactic and exciting." Similar critical adulation was expressed for his work in such roles as the Duke of Mantua in Rigoletto and Calaf in Turandot.

His versatility, preparedness, and stamina were legendary. When he performed both Turiddu in Cavalleria Rusticana and Canio in Pagliacci, rarely ever attempted, the New York Times lauded him for singing both parts "with their different tessitura and their severe demands on an artist's vocal and histrionic endurance", and for delivering each "with remarkable control of his fine voice and an unusual depth of human feeling. That same evening he went on to sing Don Jose in Carmen.

Gari could always be counted on to appear whenever occasion demanded and to deliver superb performances, even when he was singing a regular 32-week schedule. Once during the Metropolitan Opera's annual seven-week tour he was flown to Boston to sing his first Don Carlo in a performance hailed as "sterling." He also astounded everyone when he made last-minute appearances as the Duke in Rigoletto, Don Jose in Carmen, and Dimitry in Boris Godunov, on three successive nights.

Gari also appeared frequently as a guest artist. He sang in a movie version of Verdi's La Traviata. He performed in Kodály's Psalmus Hungaricus at Carnegie Hall, and in the American premiere of Ildebrando Pizzetti's L’Assassinio nella Cattedrale at the Empire State Music Festival.

Retirement 

Gari retired from the Metropolitan in 1961. In 1964, he became director of the Voice Department of the Long Island Institute of Music. He also taught voice at Lehigh University. In 1970 he joined the faculty of the Curtis Institute of Music in Philadelphia. In 1974, he began teaching at Temple University. During this time, he also maintained his private voice studio in Manhattan and served as Cantor at Temple Sinai in Forest Hills, New York.

In 2002, his widow Gloria Gari established a foundation to honor Giulio Gari. It holds a vocal competition annually in New York City.

References

New York Times: "Giulio Gari Is Dead; Operatic Tenor, 84," April 19, 1994, accessed Jan.1, 2010

External links
Giulio Gari website

1909 births
1994 deaths
People from Mediaș
20th-century Hungarian male opera singers
Operatic tenors
Hungarian emigrants to the United States